Blanca Romero Ezama (born 2 June 1976) is a Spanish actress, model, and singer.

Biography 
Blanca Romero was born on 2 June 1976 in Gijón. Her parents are of Peruvian and Romani descent.

Career 
At age 14, she appeared in her first fashion show at a boutique in Gijón. As a result, she became interested in the subject of fashion; at 17 she moved to Madrid, and two years later to Paris to work at fashion magazines such as Givenchy and Madame Figaro.

She composed her first song in 2001. In mid-2006, she began a short-lived musical career under the stage name La Perra.

She took part in some reports for the Antena 3 television program PuntoDoc. She has appeared on the cover of the Spanish edition of Elle on several occasions, and posed nude in a special issue to raise awareness of water scarcity and pollution issues for Expo 2008 in Zaragoza.

She made her film debut in 2009 with After, for which she was nominated for Best New Actress at the 24th Goya Awards.

In 2015, she starred in the first season of the Antena 3 series Bajo sospecha, playing an undercover police officer partnered with Yon González. After its renewal for a second season, it was published that Romero would not continue in the project, and would be replaced by Olivia Molina.

In 2020, it was confirmed that she would reprise her role as Irene Calvo Azpeolea in Física o químicaː El reencuentro for the platform Atresplayer Premium.

Personal life
On 11 September 1998, she gave birth to her first child, a girl named Lucía Romero Ezama. On 10 July 2015 she revealed the identity of the biological father of her daughter Lucía through an Instagram photo.

On 26 October 2001 she married the bullfighter Cayetano Rivera Ordóñez in the church of San Pedro in Gijón. Cayetano legally adopted Blanca's daughter, Lucía. They divorced in 2004.

On 21 July 2012 she gave birth to her second child, a boy named Martín Romero Ezama.

Filmography

Television

Movies

References

External links
 
 
 

1976 births
21st-century Spanish women singers
21st-century Spanish singers
Actors from Asturias
Living people
People from Gijón
Singers from Asturias
Spanish female models
Spanish television actresses
Romani actresses
Spanish people of Romani descent
Spanish people of Peruvian descent